The 2022 São Paulo state election took place in the state of São Paulo, Brazil on 2 October 2022 and 30 October 2022 (second round, if necessary). Voters elected a Governor, Vice Governor, one Senator, 70 representatives for the Chamber of Deputies, and 94 Legislative Assembly members. The incumbent Governor, Rodrigo Garcia, of the Brazilian Social Democracy Party (PSDB), was eligible for a second term and ran for reelection.

Garcia was elected Vice Governor in 2018 and took office as the governor on April 1, 2022, with the resignation of the incumbent João Doria, due to his then candidacy for the Presidency of Republic, which he ended up withdrawing on May 23, 2022. For the election to the Federal Senate, the seat occupied by José Serra (PSDB) since 2014, was at dispute, and the incumbent said that he will run for a seat at the Chamber of Deputies.

Electoral calendar

Legislative Assembly 
The result of the last state election and the current situation in the Legislative Assembly of São Paulo is given below:

Gubernatorial candidates
The party conventions began on July 20 and will continue until August 5th. The following political parties have already confirmed their candidacies. Political parties have until August 15, 2022, to formally register their candidates.

Candidates in runoff

Candidates failing to make runoff

Withdrawn candidates
 Arthur do Val (UNIÃO) - State Deputy of São Paulo 2019–2022; candidate for Mayor of São Paulo in 2020. He was a potential candidate for governor affiliated to Podemos (PODE). He withdrew his candidacy on March 5, 2022, after the negative repercussion of his leaked audios with sexist statements about Ukrainian refugees.
 Guilherme Boulos (PSOL) - Born in São Paulo in 1982. Social activist, coordinator of the Homeless Workers' Movement, professor and writer. Candidate for President in 2018 and for Mayor of São Paulo in 2020. He withdrew his candidacy for governor on March 21, 2022, to become a candidate for federal deputy for São Paulo.
 Paulo Skaf (Republicanos) - President of CIESP (2007–2021) and President of FIESP (2004–2021). Skaf automatically left the race for the state government by joining the Republicans, whose candidate for the government is the former Minister of Infrastructure, Tarcísio Gomes de Freitas. Skaf was considered to be the running mate on Tarcísio's ticket or candidate for the Federal Senate instead of TV presenter and journalist José Luiz Datena (PSC).
 Mariana Conti (PSOL) - Councillor of Campinas (since 2020). Sociologist and doctoral student in political science at the State University of Campinas (Unicamp). She withdrew her candidacy on June 24, 2022, after failing to reach an agreement on a Socialism and Liberty Party candidacy for the Government of the State of São Paulo. This decision was taken because the party leadership has an interest into supporting the candidacy of Fernando Haddad from the Workers' Party (PT).
 Felício Ramuth (PSD) - Mayor of São José dos Campos 2017–2022; former Municipal Secretary of Transports and Communication Planning Advisor of São José dos Campos. The president of the Social Democratic Party, Gilberto Kassab sealed an agreement with the president of Republicanos, Marcos Pereira, for the party's support to the candidacy of Tarcísio Gomes de Freitas. Ramuth became the possible running mate of Tarcísio's ticket after this decision.
 Márcio França (PSB) - Governor of São Paulo 2018–2019; Vice Governor of São Paulo 2015–2018; State Secretary of Development of São Paulo 2015–2018; State Secretary of Sports, Leisure and Tourism of São Paulo 2011–2015; Federal Deputy from São Paulo 2007–2011; Mayor of São Vicente 1997–2005; City Councillor of São Vicente 1989–1997. On a video posted on his social media, França withdrew his candidacy after he made a promise where he said he would support the candidacy that held the best chances on the progressive camp based on opinion polls for the government of São Paulo. As Fernando Haddad has been leading the polls since Geraldo Alckmin decided to leave the dispute to be the running mate on Lula's presidential ticket, França said that he'll fulfill his promise by withdrawing his gubernatorial candidacy. Soon after, he declared support for Haddad's candidacy, and there has been some speculation of a senate run on the Brazil of Hope's coalition.
 Abraham Weintraub (PMB) - Minister of Education of Brazil 2019–2020 and World Bank Group Executive Director from the 15th district 2020–22. During the party's convention, Weintraub said that the conservative right don't have a "voice" and that's why he decided to become a candidate for federal deputy for São Paulo.

Senatorial candidates
The party conventions began on July 20 and will continue until August 5th. The following political parties have already confirmed their candidacies. Political parties have until August 15, 2022, to formally register their candidates.

Confirmed candidates

Rejected candidacies 

 Sergio Moro (UNIÃO) - Federal judge of the Federal Regional Court of the 4th Region (TRF-4) 1996–2018 and Minister of Justice and Public Security in the Jair Bolsonaro's cabinet (2019–2020). He was a potential candidate for the Federal Senate in the state of São Paulo, but the Regional Electoral Court of São Paulo (TRE-SP) rejected the transfer of voting domicile, on the grounds that the former judge didn't have a professional relationship with the State. He can appeal to the Superior Electoral Court (TSE), but decided to run for the Senate representing the state of Paraná.
 Paulo Skaf (Republicanos) - President of CIESP (2007–2021) and President of FIESP (2004–2021). He was one of the possible names for the Senate race in the state of São Paulo. However, the Republicans convention decided to support Marcos Pontes' candidacy.
 Nise Yamaguchi (PROS) - Oncologist and immunologist, university professor. Her party officially endorsed Fernando Haddad and Márcio França, joining the Together for São Paulo coalition. Yamaguchi filed a lawsuit in the electoral justice for an independent candidacy, awaiting decision.

Withdrawn candidacies 

 José Luiz Datena (PSC) - TV presenter and journalist. He announced the withdrawal of his candidacy for the Federal Senate and said that his decision was influenced by attacks from radical groups.
 Arthur Weintraub (PMB) - Special advisor to the Presidency of the Republic (2019–20) and Secretary of Multidimensional Security at the Organization of American States (OAS) 2020–2022. He withdrew his candidacy for the Senate and decided to be a candidate for Federal Deputy.
 Cristiane Brasil (PTB) - Federal Deputy from Rio de Janeiro (2015–19). She withdrew her candidacy for the Senate, decided to be a candidate for Federal Deputy and endorsed former minister Marcos Pontes (PL).
 Heni Ozi Cukier (PODE) - State Deputy of São Paulo (since 2019). With the formalization of the national alliance between Podemos, Brazilian Democratic Movement and the Brazilian Social Democracy Party, Cukier ended up losing space on Rodrigo Garcia's ticket, who preferred to accommodate other names of allied parties. With this scenario, the deputy ended up giving up his candidacy to run for the Chamber of Deputies.

Debate list
For the first time in the Brazilian general elections since 1989, television and radio stations, newspapers and news websites group themselves into pools to hold gubernatorial debates, by request of the campaigns in order to reduce the number of debates scheduled for the 2022 elections.

As of 29 August 2022, the following presidential debates were held or scheduled (times in UTC−03:00):

Opinion polls

Governor

First round

The first round is scheduled to take place on 2 October 2022.

2022

2021

Second round
The second round (if necessary) is scheduled to take place on 30 October 2022.

 

2022

Haddad vs. Tarcísio de Freitas

Haddad vs. Garcia

Tarcísio de Freitas vs. Garcia

Hypothetical scenarios with Márcio França

Senator

2022

2021

Results

Governor

Senator

Chamber of Deputies

Legislative Assembly

Notes

References

Sao Paolo
2022
2022 elections in Brazil